The Men's AHF Cup is a quadrennial international men's field hockey competition in Asia organized by the Asian Hockey Federation. The tournament was founded in 1997 and serves as a qualification tournament for the next Men's Asia Cup.

Results

Summaries

Top four statistics

Team appearances

See also
 Men's Hockey Asia Cup
 Men's Junior AHF Cup
 Women's AHF Cup

References

External links
 Asian Hockey Federation
todor66.com archive

 
AHF Cup
AHF Cup
AHF Cup